The 1977 Australian Rally Championship was a series of five rallying events held across Australia. It was the tenth season in the history of the competition.

Ross Dunkerton and navigator Jeff Beaumont in the Datsun 260Z tied with George Fury and navigator Monty Suffern in the Datsun 710 Coupe for the 1977 Championship.

Season review

The tenth Australian Rally Championship was held over five events across Australia, the season consisting of one event each for Victoria, Queensland, New South Wales, South Australia and Western Australia.  The 1977 season was a closely fought battle between the Datsuns of Dunkerton and Fury and at the end of the season they could not be separated and thus tied for the championship.

The Rallies

The five events of the 1977 season were as follows.

Round Two – Rally of the West

Round Four – Bega Valley Rally

1977 Drivers and Navigators Championships
Final pointscore for 1977 is as follows.

Ross Dunkerton and George Fury – Champion Drivers 1977

Jeff Beaumont and Monty Suffern – Champion Navigators 1977

References

External links
  Results of Snowy Mountains Rally and ARC results.

Rally Championship
Rally competitions in Australia
1977 in rallying